Andwuelle Wright (born 8 August 1997) is a Trinidad and Tobago long jumper.

In the age-specific categories, he competed prolifically on regional level. He also competed at the 2013 World Youth Championships and the 2014 Youth Olympics without reaching the final.

He finished fifth at the 2018 NACAC Championships and won the bronze medal at the 2018 Central American and Caribbean Games.

His personal best jump is 8.23 metres, achieved in June 2018 at the national championships in Port-of-Spain. This is the Trinidad and Tobago record.

References

1997 births
Living people
Trinidad and Tobago male long jumpers
Athletes (track and field) at the 2014 Summer Youth Olympics
Competitors at the 2018 Central American and Caribbean Games
Athletes (track and field) at the 2019 Pan American Games
Pan American Games competitors for Trinidad and Tobago
Central American and Caribbean Games medalists in athletics
Athletes (track and field) at the 2022 Commonwealth Games